François Henri Goullet de Rugy (born 6 December 1973) is a French politician who served as President of the National Assembly from 2017 to 2018 and Minister of Ecological and Solidary Transition from 2018 to 2019.

Since 2007, he has represented the Loire-Atlantique department, with an interruption between 2018 and 2019, originally as a member of the Democratic and Republican Left group, which includes his former political party Europe Ecology – The Greens. In 2015, he joined the Ecologist Party and later the La République En Marche group in Parliament. In 2017, he defeated Jean-Charles Taugourdeau and Laure de la Raudière for the presidency of the National Assembly.

He was appointed Minister of Ecological and Solidary Transition after the resignation of Nicolas Hulot. De Rugy resigned from his ministership less than a year following his appointment after allegations of excessive spending of public funds for private use. He regained his seat in Parliament.

De Rugy did not seek re-election at the 2022 parliamentary election.

Biography

Early political career
First elected to the National Assembly in the 2007 legislative election, he was reelected in 2012. In 2012, he was elected to the co-presidency of the newly-founded Ecologist group, alongside Barbara Pompili. In 2015, he broke with Europe Ecology – The Greens to form a new party with Jean-Vincent Placé, the Ecologist Party, which supported the administration of President François Hollande. He was succeeded as group co-president by Cécile Duflot before regaining the office following the Pompili's appointment as Secretary of State for Biodiversity.

As a member of the National Assembly, he supported the 2015 Intelligence Act and 2016 Labour Act.

In 2016, he announced a campaign for the 2017 Socialist Party presidential primary in which he secured 3.8% of the vote in the first round, outstripping polls. Though he promised to support the primary winner, he reneged on that commitment in late February, instead backing Emmanuel Macron over Benoît Hamon. De Rugy was subsequently invested by En Marche! in the upcoming legislative election.

Presidency of the National Assembly

On 18 May 2016, François de Rugy succeeded Denis Baupin as a Vice President of the National Assembly. He has resigned as group co-president the previous day. On 27 June 2017, De Rugy was elected President of the National Assembly after being chosen as candidate by the La République En Marche group with 353 votes (out of 577 members).

Minister of Ecological and Solidary Transition
On 4 September 2018, De Rugy was appointed Minister of Ecological and Solidary Transition in the government of Prime Minister Édouard Philippe. He replaced Nicolas Hulot who had announced his resignation on 28 August 2018 on France Inter. On 10 July 2019, online magazine Mediapart revealed that €63,000 of public money had been spent on refurbishment of De Rugy's official apartment in Paris (including €19,000 on a dressing room). The magazine also published photographs of lobster and champagne dinners. On 16 July 2019, De Rugy resigned as Ecology Minister.

Return to the National Assembly
On 17 August 2019, François de Rugy regained his seat in the National Assembly. In September 2020, he was a candidate to succeed Gilles Le Gendre as LREM group president in the National Assembly. He came in third behind Christophe Castaner and Aurore Bergé. In the final round, he endorsed Bergé.

In the 2021 regional election, De Rugy led the LREM list in Pays de la Loire (supported by the Democratic Movement and Radical Movement), which placed fifth, with 11.9% of the vote in the first round and 8.20% in the second round.

In addition to his committee assignments, De Rugy chaired the France-Taiwan parliamentary friendship group.

In February 2022, De Rugy announced that he would not stand in the 2022 elections but instead resign from active politics by the end of the parliamentary term.

References

External links
 
 Champagne, homard… Les luxueux dîners de François de Rugy aux frais de l’Assemblée nationale

1973 births
Living people
Europe Ecology – The Greens politicians
Sciences Po alumni
Politicians from Nantes
La République En Marche! politicians
Presidents of the National Assembly (France)
Deputies of the 13th National Assembly of the French Fifth Republic
Deputies of the 14th National Assembly of the French Fifth Republic
Deputies of the 15th National Assembly of the French Fifth Republic
Members of Parliament for Loire-Atlantique